Colaspis flavocostata is a species of leaf beetle from North America. It is found in the coastal states of the United States; its range spans from Mississippi to Florida and to South Carolina. It was first described by the American entomologist Charles Frederic August Schaeffer in 1933.

Subspecies
These two subspecies belong to the species Colaspis flavocostata:
 Colaspis flavocostata avaloni Blake, 1974 i c g
 Colaspis flavocostata flavocostata Schaeffer, 1933 i c g
Data sources: i = ITIS, c = Catalogue of Life, g = GBIF, b = Bugguide.net

References

Further reading

 

Eumolpinae
Articles created by Qbugbot
Beetles described in 1933
Beetles of the United States
Taxa named by Charles Frederic August Schaeffer